Amalia Catharina (8 August 1640 – 4 January 1697), Countess of , was a German poet and composer. She was born in Arolsen to Count Philipp Theodor von Waldeck-Eisenberg and the Countess Marie Magdalene of Nassau-Siegen. In 1664, she married George Louis I, Count of Erbach-Erbach, the son of George Albert I, Count of Erbach-Schönberg. She published a number of Pietist poems and songs in Hildburghausen in 1692. They were meant for private household devotion. There were 67 poems, some of which had simple melodies and a figured bass.

Issue
She and her husband had sixteen children:

 Henriette (27 September 1665 – 28 September 1665).
 Henriette Juliane (15 October 1666 – 27 February 1684).
 Philipp Louis, Count of Erbach-Erbach (10 June 1669 – 17 June 1720).
 Charles Albert Louis (16 June 1670 – k.a. Dapfing a.d.Donau, 18 August 1704).
 George Albert (born and died 1 July 1671).
 Amalie Katharina (13 May 1672 – 18 June 1676).
 Frederick Charles (19 April 1673 – 20 April 1673).
 A son (born and died 16 September 1674).
 Wilhelmine Sophie (16 February 1675 – 20 August 1675).
 Magdalena Charlotte (6 February 1676 – 3 December 1676).
 Wilhelm Louis (21 March 1677 – 19 February 1678).
 Amalie Katharina (born and died 18 February 1678).
 Fredericka Charlotte (19 April 1679 – 21 April 1679).
 Frederick Charles, Count of Erbach-Limpurg (21 May 1680 – 20 February 1731).
 Ernest (23 September 1681 – 2 March 1684).
 Sophia Albertine (30 July 1683 – 4 September 1742), married on 4 February 1704 to Ernest Frederick I, Duke of Saxe-Hildburghausen.

References
Walter Blankenburg. "Amalia Catharina", Grove Music Online, ed. L. Macy (accessed March 5, 2006), grovemusic.com (subscription access).

Notes

External links 

 

1640 births
1697 deaths
German classical composers
German Baroque composers
German women composers
People from Bad Arolsen
People from Waldeck (state)
House of Waldeck
17th-century classical composers
Women classical composers
German countesses
17th-century German composers
17th-century women composers